The Breeders Crown Open Mare Trot is a harness racing event for three-year-old and older Standardbred mare trotters. It is one part of the Breeders Crown annual series of twelve races for both Standardbred trotters and pacers. First run in 1986, it is contested over a distance of one mile. Race organizers have awarded the event to various racetracks across North America. The 2017 race will be held at Hoosier Park in Anderson, Indiana, United States.

Historical race events
In 1989, Grades Singing won a record third Open Mare Trot. An international trotting star in top level races, in 1987 she won Sweden's Olympiatravet, Finland's Finlandia-Ajo, and Italy's  Gran Premio Lotteria. The following year she returned to Europe where she claimed victory for a second time in Italy's 1988 Gran Premio Lotteria plus that country's Gran Premio delle Nazioni.

In 1990, Peace Corps won her first of two Open Mare Trots, doing it in World Record time. Her 1992 win in the Open Mare Trot made her the only horse in history to win four Breeders Crown races.

From 1996 through 2003 the Open Mare Trot was not run and female horses were left to compete against their male counterparts in the Breeders Crown Open Trot.

In 2010, Pocono Downs became the first venue to host all 12 events on a single night.

North American Locations
Meadowlands Racetrack (Mxx) New Jersey (5)
Mohawk Raceway (Moh) Ontario (5)
Woodbine Racetrack (Wdb) Ontario (3)
Pocono Downs (Pcd) Pennsylvania (2)
Batavia Downs (Btv) New York (1)
Blue Bonnets Raceway (Bbr) Quebec (1)
Delaware County Fair Racetrack (Dela) Ohio (1)
Freehold Raceway (Fhl) New Jersey (1)
Northfield Park (Nfl) Ohio (1)
Pompano Park (Ppk) Florida (1)
Scioto Downs (Scd) Ohio (1)
The Meadows Racetrack (Mea) Pennsylvania (1)

Records
 Most wins by a horse
 3 – Grades Singing (1986, 1987, 1989)

 Most wins by a driver
 2 – Olle Goop (1987, 1989), Ronald Pierce (2004, 2006), Tim Tetrick (2009, 2010), Brian Sears (2012, 2014), Yannick Gingras (2013, 2016)

 Most wins by a trainer
 3 – Ron Burke (2009, 2010, 2016)

 Stakes record
 1:53 1/5 – Peaceful Way (2005)

Winners of the Breeders Crown Open Mare Trot

See also
List of Breeders Crown Winners

External links
YouTube video titled "1989 Breeders Crown Aged Mare Trot Grades Singing" 
YouTube video of Peace Corps World Record win in the 1990 Open Breeders Crown

References

Recurring sporting events established in 1986
Harness racing in the United States
Breeders Crown
Harness racing in Canada
Horse races in New Jersey
Horse races in Florida
Horse races in Pennsylvania
Horse races in New York (state)
Horse races in Ontario
Horse races in Ohio
Horse races in Canada
1986 establishments in North America